The 1902 Italian Football Championship season was won by Genoa.

Qualifications

Group Piedmont

Final classification

Results

|}

Tie-breaker

|}

Group Liguria and Lombardy

|}

Semifinal
Played on April 6

|}

Final
Played on April 13

|}

References and sources
Almanacco Illustrato del Calcio - La Storia 1898-2004, Panini Edizioni, Modena, September 2005

Footnotes

1902
1901–02 in European association football leagues
1901–02 in Italian football